The Necrotic Manifesto is the eighth album by Belgian death metal band Aborted.  It was released on April 29, 2014, in Europe, through Century Media Records. The album was recorded at Hansen Studios in Denmark with producer Jacob Hansen.

The first single, "Necrotic Manifesto", was released digitally on March 14, 2014. The song "Purity of Perversion" is named after the band's debut album.
The album charted in the USA (Heatseeker charts spot 4), The Netherlands, Germany, Belgium and France.

Track listing

Personnel

Aborted

Sven de Caluwé: Vocals
Mendel bij de Leij: Guitar
Danny Tunker: Guitar
JB van der Wal: Bass
Ken Bedene: Drums

Guest musicians
Vincent Bennett (The Acacia Strain)
Phlegethon (Wormed)

Production
Jacob Hansen – producer, engineer, mixing, mastering
Alex Karlinsky – sound design
Pär Olofsson – artwork

References 

2014 albums
Aborted (band) albums
Century Media Records albums
Albums with cover art by Pär Olofsson
Albums produced by Jacob Hansen